Ligumia recta is a species of freshwater mussel, an aquatic bivalve mollusk in the family Unionidae, the river mussels. 

This species is found in eastern North America. It is native to the drainages of the Mississippi River, the drainages of the Great Lakes, and some Gulf Coast drainages.

The black sandshell can be up to 10 inches (25 cm) long, and is elongate and quadrate in shape. The shell is usually heavy, fairly thick, somewhat inflated and cylindrical.

References

 Williams, J. D.; Bogan, A. E.; Garner, J. T. (2008). Freshwater mussels of Alabama and the Mobile Basin in Georgia, Mississippi and Tennessee. University of Alabama Press, Tuscaloosa. 908 pp
 nvertEBase. (2015). Authority files of U.S. and Canadian land and freshwater mollusks developed for the InvertEBase project (invertebase.org).

External links
 Lamarck [J.-B. M. de. (1819). Histoire naturelle des animaux sans vertèbres. Tome 6(1): vi + 343 pp. Paris: published by the author.]

Molluscs of the United States
recta
Bivalves described in 1819
Taxonomy articles created by Polbot